Aktuganovo (Aqtuğan) is a rural locality (a selo) in Staroyashevsky Selsoviet, Kaltasinsky District, Bashkortostan, Russia. The population was 326 as of 2010. There are 7 streets.

Geography 
Aktuganovo is located 37 km east of Kaltasy (the district's administrative centre) by road. Semyonkino is the nearest rural locality.

References 

Rural localities in Kaltasinsky District